Saundersina is a genus of beetles in the family Buprestidae, containing the following species:

 Saundersina amazonica (Saunders, 1874)
 Saundersina modesta (Fabricius, 1781)
 Saundersina vitticollis (Saunders, 1874)

References

Buprestidae genera